This is a list of films produced in the Netherlands during the 2010s.

2010

2011

2012

2013

2014

2015

2016

2018

2019

References

2010s
Films
Dutch